Michael Sexton (born August 22, 1961) is an American politician in the state of Iowa. He has served in the Iowa House of Representatives as a Republican representative for District 10 since 2015.

Sexton was born in Fort Dodge and attended Iowa Lakes Community College. He is a farmer. A Republican, he also served in the Iowa State Senate from 1999 to 2003 (7th district).

References

1961 births
Living people
Politicians from Fort Dodge, Iowa
Farmers from Iowa
Republican Party members of the Iowa House of Representatives
Republican Party Iowa state senators
21st-century American politicians